Éragny-sur-Epte (literally Éragny on Epte) is a commune in the Oise department in northern France.

In 1884, the artist Camille Pissarro and his family moved from his home near Pontoise to Éragny on the River Epte. This was to be his principal place of residence until his death in 1903 and an ideal setting for his paintings of rural labour and the harvest.

Gallery

See also
 Communes of the Oise department

References

Communes of Oise